The 2003 Florida Gators football team represented the University of Florida in the sport of American football during the 2003 college football season.  The Gators competed in Division I-A of the National Collegiate Athletic Association (NCAA) and the Eastern Division of the Southeastern Conference (SEC), and played their home games at Ben Hill Griffin Stadium on the university's Gainesville, Florida campus.  They were led by second-year coach Ron Zook, who coached the Gators to a first-place tie in the SEC East, an Outback Bowl berth, and an overall win–loss record of 8–5 (.615).  Consensus All-American Keiwan Ratliff set the school single-season interception mark in 2003 with 9.

Schedule

Sources: 2012 Florida Football Media Guide, and GatorZone.com.

Personnel

Season summary

San Jose State

Miami (FL)

Florida A&M

Tennessee

Kentucky

Ole Miss

LSU

Arkansas

Georgia

Vanderbilt

South Carolina

Florida State

Outback Bowl

Bibliography 

 2009 Southeastern Conference Football Media Guide, Florida Year-by-Year Records, Southeastern Conference, Birmingham, Alabama, p. 60 (2009).
  2012 Florida Football Media Guide, University Athletic Association, Gainesville, Florida, pp. 107–116 (2012).
 Carlson, Norm, University of Florida Football Vault: The History of the Florida Gators, Whitman Publishing, LLC, Atlanta, Georgia (2007).  .

References

Florida
Florida Gators football seasons
Florida Gators football